Joel Turner and the Modern Day Poets is a collaborative studio album by Joel Turner and the Modern Day Poets. It was released on 1 November 2004, peaking at number 28 on the ARIA Albums Chart and number 2 on the AIR independent charts, additionally achieving platinum status.

The album consists of twelve full songs and eight beatboxing skits. It is best described as hip hop fused with a mixture of rock, pop, R&B, funk, soul and jazz. The music generally consists of Turner's vocal percussion and guitar, with the Modern Day Poets (Turner's brother and cousin) providing the rap. Many of the tracks pertain to real-life issues.

Guest artists on the album include Australian Idol contestants Axle Whitehead and Rebekah LaVauney. Hence, the song "Scatbox" is a combination of Whitehead's scatting and Turner's beatboxing, while LaVauney performs vocals on the track "Behind Bars", a song she wrote about a partner's incarceration. In addition, boxer Anthony Mundine is heard rapping on the album's second single "Knock U Out", and former CDB singer Gary Pinto provides backing vocals on the song "Lady".

The album was well received by critics and spawned four successful singles. It was also nominated for Best Urban Release and Best Independent Release at the 2005 ARIA Awards.

Track listing
"These Kids" (radio edit)Writers: J. Turner, T. TurnerProducers: Joel Turner, Steve Scanlon
"Beethoven Beats" (Beatbox track)
"Funk U Up"Writers: J. Turner, T. Turner, C. TurnerProducers: Joel Turner, Craig Porteils
"Knock U Out"Writers: T. Turner, J. Turner, C. Turner, J. Peterik, F. Sullivan IIIProducers: Joel Turner, Craig Porteils
"Drum and Bass" (Beatbox track)
"Respect"Writers: J. Turner, T. Turner, C. Turner, M. Puni, B. BouroProducers: Joel Turner, Craig Porteils
"Scatbox"Writers: J. Turner, A. Whitehead, C. PorteilsProducers: Joel Turner, Axle Whitehead, Craig Porteils
"Turn Up the Bass" (Beatbox track)
"Lady"Writers: J. Turner, T. Turner, C. TurnerProducers: Joel Turner, Craig Porteils
"Jungle Rhythm" (Beatbox track)
"Behind Bars"Writers: J. Turner, T. Turner, C. Turner, R. LaVauneyProducers: Joel Turner, Craig Porteils
"Hip Hop"Writers: J. Turner, T. Turner, C. Turner, C. MacAvoyProducers: Joel Turner, Craig Porteils
"Rally Car" (Beatbox track)
"Up in the Studio"Writers: J. Turner, T. Turner, C. TurnerProducers: Joel Turner, Craig Porteils
"Teeth" (Beatbox track)
"The Real JT"Writer: J. TurnerProducers: Joel Turner, Gary Deleo
"These Kids" (Scanmix)Writers: J. Turner, T. TurnerProducers: Joel Turner, Steve Scanlon
"The Big JT" (Beatbox track)
"Brisbane City"Writers: J. Turner, T. Turner, C. Turner, J. MacAvoyProducers: Joel Turner, Craig Porteils
"Smoker" (Beatbox track)

Charts

Certifications

References

External links
 
 

Joel Turner (musician) albums
2004 albums